The Lost Creek Bridge is a covered bridge near the unincorporated community of Lake Creek, in Jackson County in the U.S. state of Oregon. It carries Lost Creek Road over Lost Creek, a tributary of Little Butte Creek.

The bridge was added to the National Register of Historic Places in 1979. In that same year, it was closed to vehicle traffic. A newer concrete bridge runs parallel to the wooden bridge and serves as a bypass.

Anecdotal accounts and limited evidence suggest that the bridge might have been built as early as 1878. If confirmed, this would make it the oldest standing covered bridge in the state. The Oregon Department of Transportation says that the official construction date of 1919 may actually refer to a renovation of an older bridge.

Architecture
The truss of the bridge is a queen post-style modified by cross members. Other features include open ends rather than the usual portal arches, ribbon openings at the eaves, and buttresses that are cantilevered. The bridge has a shingle roof and a floor of diagonal planking. Local residents installed a new roof in 1985.

Park
Adjacent to the bridge is the Walch Family Wayside Park. Descendants of pioneer settlers John and Marie Newsome Walch built and maintain the park, which includes picnic tables, a bandstand, flower gardens, and other amenities.

See also
 List of bridges on the National Register of Historic Places in Oregon
 List of Oregon covered bridges
 List of Registered Historic Places in Jackson County, Oregon

References

External links
 

Covered bridges on the National Register of Historic Places in Oregon
National Register of Historic Places in Jackson County, Oregon
Bridges completed in 1919
Wooden bridges in Oregon
Transportation buildings and structures in Jackson County, Oregon
Tourist attractions in Jackson County, Oregon
1919 establishments in Oregon
Road bridges on the National Register of Historic Places in Oregon
Queen post truss bridges in the United States